N-Tyce were a British four-piece girl group consisting of Ario Obubore, Chantal Kerzner, Donna Stubbs, and Michelle Robinson. The group recorded for Telstar Records in the late 1990s.

They emerged when the Spice Girls were at the peak of their fame. They clocked up four top-20 hit singles, including "We Come to Party" and "Boom Boom". The group also released an album, All Day Every Day. "We Come to Party" was also repackaged and marketed in the U.S. as the group's debut U.S. release.

Discography

Albums
 All Day Every Day (1998) - UK #44

Singles
 "Hey DJ! (Play That Song)" (June 1997) - UK #20
 "We Come to Party" (September 1997) - UK #12
 "Telefunkin'" (February 1998) - UK #16
 "Boom Boom" (June 1998) - UK #18

References

English pop music groups
English girl groups
British contemporary R&B musical groups
British pop girl groups
Telstar Records artists
British hip hop girl groups
British R&B girl groups
Musical groups established in 1996
Musical groups disestablished in 1999